Jonathan, Jon or Jonny Bell may refer to:

Jon Bell (born 1997), American soccer player
Jonny Bell (rugby union) (born 1974), Ireland rugby union player
Jonathan Bell (politician) (born 1970), Democratic Unionist Party politician in Northern Ireland
Jonathan Anderson Bell (1806–1865), Scottish architect
Jonathan Bell (field hockey) (born 1987), Irish field hockey player

See also
Jonathan Bell Lovelace (1895–1979), founder of The Capital Group Companies
John Bell (disambiguation)